David Magie Childs (born April 1, 1941) is an American architect and chairman emeritus of the architectural firm Skidmore, Owings & Merrill.  He is the architect of the new One World Trade Center in New York City.

Early life and education
Childs graduated from Deerfield Academy in Deerfield, Massachusetts, in 1959 and from Yale University in New Haven, Connecticut in 1963. He first majored in zoology before he then turned to architecture at  the Yale School of Architecture and earned his master's degree in 1967.

Career
He joined the Washington, D.C., office of SOM in 1971, after working with Nathaniel Owings and Daniel Patrick Moynihan on plans for the redevelopment of Pennsylvania Avenue.  Childs was a design partner of the firm in Washington until 1984, when he moved to SOM's New York Office.

His major projects include: in Washington, D.C., 1201 Pennsylvania Avenue, the Four Seasons Hotel, master plans for the National Mall, the U.S. News & World Report headquarters, and the headquarters for National Geographic; in New York City, Worldwide Plaza, 450 Lexington Avenue, Bertelsmann Tower, and One World Trade Center; and internationally, the Embassy of the United States, Ottawa, and the Changi international terminal in Singapore.

Childs served as the chairman of the National Capital Planning Commission from 1975 to 1981 and he was appointed to the U.S. Commission of Fine Arts in 2002, serving as chairman from 2003 to 2005.  He was the recipient of a Rome Prize in 2004; named a senior fellow of the Design Futures Council in 2010; and has served on the boards of the Municipal Art Society, the Museum of Modern Art, and the American Academy in Rome.

Skidmore, Owings & Merrill projects

Washington, D.C. (1971–1985)
 Metro Center (1976)
 Formerly the Daon Building, now the Inter-American Development Bank, 1300 New York Avenue, NW (1984)
 National Geographic headquarters M Street building (1985)
 Four Seasons (1979), Regent, and Park Hyatt Washington (1986) hotels
 Expansion of the Dulles Airport main terminal
 U.S. News & World Report headquarters
 University Yard, 1985-1986 restoration, The George Washington University

New York City (1984–present)

Completed

 Worldwide Plaza 825 8th Avenue (1989)
 Bertelsmann Building, 1540 Broadway (1990)
 383 Madison Avenue (2002)
 Time Warner Center, Columbus Circle (2003)
 Times Square Tower, 7 Times Square (2004)
 7 World Trade Center 250 Greenwich Street (2006)
 One World Trade Center (2014)
 450 Lexington Avenue (over the Grand Central Station Post Office at Grand Central Terminal)
 New York Mercantile Exchange
 JFK International Airport Arrivals Building
 New Pennsylvania Station (Moynihan Train Hall) at James Farley Post Office Building

Planned
 New New York Stock Exchange
 Renovation of Lever House 390 Park Avenue

Other locations
 Embassy of the United States in Ottawa, 1999

See also
William F. Baker (engineer)
Roger Duffy
T.J. Gottesdiener
Craig W. Hartman
Ross Wimer

References

External links
WTC.com, Interview with David Childs about Freedom Tower (video)
WTC.com, Freedom Tower
"The Power Broker Yearns to Be Cool", wirednewyork.com
 A conversation with architect David Childs. About his design for the new Freedom Tower. charlierose.com

1941 births
Living people
20th-century American architects
Deerfield Academy alumni
Yale School of Architecture alumni
21st-century American architects
People from Princeton, New Jersey
Architects from New Jersey
World Trade Center